Mohammad Yamin Ahmadzai (born 25 July 1992) is an Afghan cricketer. Ahmadzai is a right-handed batsman who bowls right-arm medium-fast. He was born in Laghman Province. He was one of the eleven cricketers to play in Afghanistan's first ever Test match, against India, in June 2018, and took Afghanistan's first wicket in Test cricket.

Career
Ahmadzai made his debut for Afghanistan Under-19s in a Youth One Day International against India Under-19s in the 2010 Under-19 World Cup in New Zealand.  He made two further Youth One Day International appearances in that competition, against Hong Kong Under-19s and Papua New Guinea Under-19s.  He also played for the Under-19s in the 2011 Under-19 World Cup Qualifier in Ireland, helping Afghanistan to qualify for the main event in 2012.

Later in 2011, he made his Twenty20 debut for the Afghan Cheetahs in the Faysal Bank Twenty-20 Cup against Multan Tigers.  He scored an unbeaten single run in the Cheetahs innings, while in the Tigers innings he bowled a single over, conceding 17 runs from it.

He made his Twenty20 International debut for Afghanistan against Oman on 29 November 2015. He made his One Day International debut for Afghanistan against Zimbabwe on 25 December 2015.

He also plays first-class cricket for the Pakistan team Habib Bank Limited in the Quaid-e-Azam Trophy.

Test cricket
In May 2018, he was named in Afghanistan's squad for their inaugural Test match, played against India. He made his Test debut for Afghanistan, against India, on 14 June 2018. He took Afghanistan's first wicket in Test cricket, dismissing Shikhar Dhawan, just after lunch on day one. In February 2019, he was named in Afghanistan's Test squad for their one-off match against Ireland in India.

References

External links

1992 births
Living people
Afghan cricketers
Afghanistan Test cricketers
Afghanistan One Day International cricketers
Afghanistan Twenty20 International cricketers
Afghan Cheetahs cricketers
Pashtun people
People from Laghman Province
Habib Bank Limited cricketers
Spin Ghar Tigers cricketers
Paktia Panthers cricketers